István Aranyosi (born 1975) is a Hungarian philosopher and Assistant Professor of Philosophy at Bilkent University. He is best known for his works on philosophy of mind and metaphysics.

Books
The Peripheral Mind: Philosophy of Mind and the Peripheral Nervous System, Oxford University Press, 2013
God, Mind and Logical Space: A Revisionary Approach to Divinity, Palgrave Macmillan, 2013

See also
 Hard problem of consciousness

References

External links
István Aranyosi at Bilkent University

21st-century Hungarian philosophers
Philosophy academics
Living people
1975 births
Academic staff of Bilkent University
Central European University alumni
University of Bucharest alumni
Philosophers of mind
Metaphysicians
Philosophers of psychology
Cognitive scientists